Aliens: The Female War is the title of a sci-fi novel by Steve and Stephani Perry, set in the fictional Alien movie universe and adapted from the comic book story "Earth War".  It is the conclusion to a series also including Aliens: Earth Hive and Nightmare Asylum. The book was published by Bantam Books on July 1, 1993.

References

Alien (franchise) novels